Fort Garry is a provincial electoral division in the Canadian province of Manitoba that existed from 1958 to 2011 and was re-created in 2019. It was first created by redistribution in 1957 from parts of Iberville, Assiniboia and St. Boniface, and formally existed beginning with the 1958 provincial election. The riding is in the south-central and southwestern region of the city of Winnipeg. It is named for the historical Fort Garry which was occupied by supporters of Louis Riel during the Red River Rebellion of 1870.

Fort Garry was bordered to the east by Riel and St. Vital (across the Red River of the North), to the south by St. Norbert, to the north by Lord Roberts, and to the west by Fort Whyte. It was a mostly middle-class residential area, with some small businesses. It contained the University of Manitoba's main campus until electoral redistribution in 2008 took effect at the 2011 Manitoba general election, placing the campus in the new district of Fort Richmond.

The riding's population in 1996 was 20,383. In 1999, the average family income was $50,720, and the unemployment rate was 6.40% (though, conversely, it may be noted that 26% of the riding's residents are listed as low-income). Over 16% of Fort Garry's residents were immigrants, with 5% listing German as their ethnic origin. Almost 23% of the riding's residents have a university degree.

The service sector accounted for 17% of Fort Garry's industry, with a further 12% each in the retail trade and educational services.

Historically, Fort Garry was a safe seat for the Progressive Conservatives, who represented the riding from 1958 to 1988 and again from 1990 to 2003. Future Premier Sterling Lyon was Fort Garry's first member of the Legislative Assembly (MLA). In the provincial election of 1999, however, the New Democratic Party (NDP) came within only 30 votes of winning the riding. They made it their primary target in the 2003 election, and won it for the first time in their history.

Fort Garry's last MLA before dissolution was Kerri Irvin-Ross of the NDP, who was re-elected in the 2007 provincial election with 53% of the vote.

Following the 2008 electoral boundary redistribution, Fort Garry was largely divided between the new ridings of Fort Garry-Riverview and Fort Richmond, with a portion going to St. Norbert.

Following the 2018 redistribution, the riding was re-created from Fort Garry-Riverview, Fort Rouge, River Heights, and Fort Richmond. Fort Garry was contested in the 2019 provincial election. It is bordered by Fort Rouge and River Heights to the north; Fort Rouge, Riel, and St. Vital to the east, the latter two across the Red River; Fort Richmond and Waverley to the south; and Fort Whyte to the west.

List of provincial representatives

Electoral results

1958 general election

1959 general election

1962 general election

1966 general election

1969 general election

1973 general election

1977 general election

1981 general election

1984 by-election

1986 general election

1988 general election

1990 general election

1995 general election

1999 general election

2003 general election

2007 general election

2019 general election

References

Manitoba provincial electoral districts
Politics of Winnipeg